Hisham Zuabi (born 16 May 1969) is a former Arab-Israeli professional footballer and currently acts as the manager of Hapoel Bu'eine.

References

1969 births
Living people
Arab citizens of Israel
Arab-Israeli footballers
Israeli Muslims
Israeli footballers
Association football forwards
Hapoel Daliyat al-Karmel F.C. players
Maccabi Tel Aviv F.C. players
Hapoel Haifa F.C. players
Hapoel Be'er Sheva F.C. players
Maccabi Netanya F.C. players
Maccabi Kafr Kanna F.C. players
Hapoel Bnei Lod F.C. managers
Maccabi Ahi Nazareth F.C. managers
Israeli football managers